E4 School of Performing Arts is a talent show that aired on E4 from 3 October to 7 November 2007 and is narrated by Brian Blessed.

External links

2007 British television series debuts
2007 British television series endings